The 2015 South Tyneside Metropolitan Borough Council election was held 7 May 2015 to elect members of South Tyneside Metropolitan Borough Council in England. This was on the same day as other local elections.

Results by electoral ward

Beacon & Bents ward

Bede ward

Biddick & All Saints ward

Boldon Colliery ward

Cleadon & East Boldon ward

Cleadon Park ward

Fellgate & Hedworth ward

Harton ward

Hebburn North ward

Hebburn South ward

Horsley Hill ward

Monkton ward

Primrose ward

Simonside & Rekendyke ward

West Park ward

Westoe ward

Whitburn & Marsden ward

Whiteleas ward

References

2015 English local elections
May 2015 events in the United Kingdom
2015
21st century in Tyne and Wear